Tead or TEAD may mean:

People
Ordway Tead (1891–1973), American professor
Phillips Tead (1893–1974), American actor

Other
Tooele Army Depot (TEAD), a United States Army post in Tooele County, Utah
TEAD1. TEAD2, TEAD3, TEAD4 (transcription factors), proteins involved in handling DNA